Prunus trichamygdalus is a putative species of "wild" almond tree native to eastern Anatolia in Turkey, and nearby areas of Iran (possibly introduced). Molecular and morphological analyses show that is very similar to Prunus dulcis, the cultivated almond, differing in its shorter petioles and smaller leaves with more numerous crenulations. Its flowers are pink, and its fruits green. Non-bitter forms may be cultivated, but its native range is restricted to elevations of 1250-2100m on limestone slopes and gorges in the Lake Van area.

Notes

References 

Almonds
trichamygdalus
Flora of Turkey
Plants described in 1913